Nitol may refer to:
 Nitol botnet - A Botnet
 Nitol Solar - A Russian company involved in Solar energy